Royaucourt-et-Chailvet is a commune in the Aisne department in Hauts-de-France in northern France.

Geography
The river Ailette forms small part of the commune's southern border.

Population

See also
Communes of the Aisne department

References

Communes of Aisne
Aisne communes articles needing translation from French Wikipedia